Sphaeradenia sanctae-barbarae is a species of plant in the Cyclanthaceae family. It is endemic to Ecuador.  Its natural habitat is subtropical or tropical moist montane forests.

References

Sources

sanctaebarbarae
Endemic flora of Ecuador
Near threatened plants
Taxonomy articles created by Polbot